Mort, où est ta victoire? is a 1964 French film, directed by Hervé Bromberger. It stars Pascale Audret and Gabriele Ferzetti.

References

External links

1964 films
French drama films
Films directed by Hervé Bromberger
1960s French films